Florian Vika is an Albanian contemporary painter and visual artist from Tirana. He was graduated in the Academy of Fine Arts, Florence, Italy in 2004. His art conception is based in the reconstruction of the new values lost from ancient art which remains in every time and sharing those with post modern ones created from Picasso. This way of creating by Florian was appreciated  from the Italian professors of Accademia di Belle Arti di Firenze.

Exhibition 

2005- National Art Gallery of Albania exhibition named Finissage with Lora Arbana.
2007- National Art Gallery of Albania participates in Onufri '07, in its fourteenth  edition. 
2009- Accademia di Belle Arti di Firenze A professional discussing in public about his artistic way of creating paintings.

See also

Modern Albanian art

References 

parajsa.com
forumishqiptar.com

External links 
Academy of Fine Arts, Florence
gka.al
Onufri 14

People from Tirana
Living people
Albanian artists
Year of birth missing (living people)